Nesquik, also known as Nestlé Nesquik and Nesquik Cereal, is a family of breakfast cereals made by Cereal Partners Worldwide in a joint venture between of the American company General Mills and the Swiss company Nestlé, and based on the popular Nesquik product line.

About
Nesquik Cereal was first introduced in the US in 1999.  The cereal consists of small, 1 centimetre spheres of chocolate cereal. Nesquik Cereal is most similar to General Mills' Cocoa Puffs; it is also their most direct competitor. Nesquik Cereal is made with whole-grains and is thus a whole-grain cereal.

Nesquik Cereal is sold in dozens of countries worldwide such as the UK, Canada, Mexico, France, and Hong Kong. It is sold throughout Europe, Africa, Asia, Oceania, the Middle East, South America, and parts of North America. It is currently available in 43 countries. In 2012, Cereal Partners discontinued its distribution of Nesquik Cereal from the US market for reasons unstated by the company. It is available in 30 grams, 375 grams, 590 grams, 700 grams package sizes. Most Nesquik Cereal is manufactured in France by Cereal Partners.

Ingredients
Nesquick Cereal ingredients

Cereal Grains (whole grain wheat, maize semolina, rice flour), sugar, cocoa powder, dextrose, palm oil, salt, Fat-Reduced Cocoa Powder, trisodium phosphate, Flavouring: Vanillin, Vitamins and Minerals: vitamin C, niacin, pantothenic acid (B5), vitamin (B6), riboflavin (B2), thiamin (B1), folic acid (Folacin), vitamin B12, calcium carbonate and iron.

Nutrition
Nutritional information for Nesquik Cereal per 100-gram serving:
 Energy: 379 kcal
 Protein: 7.3 grams
 Carbohydrates: 79.1 grams
 Sugar: 35 grams
 Fat: 3.8 grams
 Saturated fat: 1.6 grams
 Fibre: 5.1 grams
 Sodium: 0.2 grams

Advertising
Cereal Partners typically advertises Nesquik Cereal more aggressively in large markets. However, wherever it is marketed it is usually on children's television channels. Nesquik Cereal advertisements are heavily marketed towards children, though there have been several marketed to adults. Almost all of Nesquik Cereal ads are displayed via TV, and not the Internet or print. The ads directed towards children often depict an animal in a high energy state, as if it is having a sugar rush.

Cartoon Network partnership
In 2002, Nesquik Cereal signed a sponsorship deal with Cartoon Network which facilitated the creation of a Nesquik 'Tongue Twister' machine appearing with Quicky the Bunny in television advertising campaigns.

See also
 Cocoa Puffs
 Nesquik
 Chocapic
 Lion Cereal

References

External links
 

1999 establishments in the United States
Products introduced in 1999
General Mills cereals
Breakfast cereals
Nestlé cereals